Olger Merkaj (born 23 July 1997) is an Albanian professional footballer who plays as a right winger or forward for Italian Serie D club Luparense.

Club career

Early life and Youth career
Merkaj was born in Vlorë, Albania and moved to Italy at age of 8. He started his youth career at U.C. Sampdoria in 2012.

Tuttocuoio
On 26 June 2016 Merkaj was loaned to Lega Pro side A.C. Tuttocuoio 1957 San Miniato. He made it his club debut on 31 July 2016 in the 2015–16 Coppa Italia match against Casertana coming on as a substitute in the 83rd minute in place of Irakli Shekiladze.

Chieri
On 2 December 2017 Casale announced that Merkaj moved to fellow Serie D side Chieri. Four days later Merkaj debuted for Chieri with a goal in the Coppa Italia Serie D 3 round against Unione Sanremo. Merkaj's goal came in the 31st minute, 4 minutes after the opening goal of the match scored by Unione Sanremo and served to end the match in the 1–1, where then advanced in the penalty shoot-out where Merkaj's side was defeated 4–2.

Foggia
On 9 July 2021, he signed with Serie C club Foggia.

Campobasso
On 21 January 2022, he moved to Campobasso.

Trapani
On 14 September 2022, he joined Trapani.

Luparense
On 5 December 2022, Merkaj left Trapani to join Luparense.

International career
Merkaj received his first international call up at the Albania national under-17 football team by coach Džemal Mustedanagić for the 2014 UEFA European Under-17 Championship elite round. However, due to health problems he was sent to a hospital in Czech Republic and was unable to participate in the tournament. He was visited at hospital by 4 Captains of all Group 4 youth national teams, Keidi Bare of Albania U17, Ryan Ledson of England U17, Filippo Romagna of Italy U17 and David Záleský of Czech Republic U17.

Following a good season with Tuttocuoio in the 2016–17 Lega Pro's first-half he received his first call-up at the Albania national under-21 football team by coach Alban Bushi for a gathering from 21–28 January 2017.

Career statistics

Club

References

External links

Olger Merkaj profile at Serie A TIM

1997 births
Living people
Footballers from Vlorë
Albanian footballers
Association football wingers
Association football forwards
Serie C players
Serie D players
U.C. Sampdoria players
A.C. Tuttocuoio 1957 San Miniato players
Casale F.B.C. players
A.C. Bra players
Calcio Foggia 1920 players
S.S.D. Città di Campobasso players
Trapani Calcio players
Albanian expatriate footballers
Albanian expatriate sportspeople in Italy
Expatriate footballers in Italy
Albania youth international footballers
Albania under-21 international footballers